Lawrenceburg Commercial Historic District may refer to:

Lawrenceburg Commercial Historic District (Lawrenceburg, Kentucky), listed on the National Register of Historic Places in Anderson County, Kentucky
Lawrenceburg Commercial Historic District (Lawrenceburg, Tennessee), listed on the National Register of Historic Places in Lawrence County, Tennessee